A number of vessels of the French Navy have borne the name Marne, after the river of that name.

, in service 1746-53.
, launched in 1806.
, in service 1826-41.
, in service 1855-78.
, in service 1916-45.
, in service 1946-57.

References

French Navy ship names